The central comarques of the Valencian Community, or Valencian Country, is a region of the Valencia Autonomous Community conterminous with the historical territory of the Governor of Xàtiva and the Province of Xàtiva. In modern times it comprises the comarques of Costera, Canal de Navarres, Vall d'Albaida, Marina (mainly the upper comarca), Comtat and Alcoià. 

The central comarques do not belong to any unitarian administration, however in 2015 the Social and Economic Council of the Valencian Central Comarques was created to advance in the integration of the territory.

References 

Comarques of the Valencian Community
Geography of the Valencian Community